Mercy Addy (born 7 May 1964) is a Ghanaian sprinter who specialized in the 400 metres.

Her personal best time is 51.0 seconds (hand timed), achieved in October 1989 in Accra. This is the current Ghanaian record. She had 52.08 seconds with electronic timing.

Achievements

References

External links
 

1964 births
Living people
Ghanaian female hurdlers
Athletes (track and field) at the 1982 Commonwealth Games
Athletes (track and field) at the 1990 Commonwealth Games
Athletes (track and field) at the 1994 Commonwealth Games
Athletes (track and field) at the 1984 Summer Olympics
Athletes (track and field) at the 1988 Summer Olympics
Athletes (track and field) at the 1996 Summer Olympics
Olympic athletes of Ghana
Commonwealth Games competitors for Ghana
African Games bronze medalists for Ghana
African Games medalists in athletics (track and field)
Athletes (track and field) at the 1987 All-Africa Games
20th-century Ghanaian women
21st-century Ghanaian women